Susie Honeyman (born 31 January 1960) is a Scottish violin player best known for her work with The Mekons. She is co-founder of the Grey Gallery.

Biography
Honeyman was born in Glasgow, Scotland.

Honeyman studied Music at the University of Edinburgh and moved to London in 1982.  She is married to painter Jock McFadyen, with whom she has two children (Annie b.1993 and George b.1995)

Apart from her long involvement with the Mekons (she joined the band in October 1983) she has played live and recorded with many musicians, including The Fire Engines, Rip Rig + Panic, The Higsons (as the Susie Honeyman String Sensation), Mari Wilson (as a Melting Moment), Hermine and accordion player Ian Hill.  Honeyman played with Vivian Stanshall from 1983 until his untimely death in 1995. She has also worked with double bassist Julia Doyle and drummer Dave Fowler and the Senegalese singer Nuru Kane.

From 1983 until 1992 Honeyman worked with Echo City, the sonic playground builders and performers, building the UK's first sonic playground in an adventure playground in Bethnal Green, making instruments, playing as a band and running music projects worldwide with children and adults with special needs, working in such varied locations as the Singapore Arts Festival, Glasgow Garden Festival, festivals in Canada and the Southbank Centre in London.

For many years she has collaborated with composer and multi-instrumentalist Giles Perring who was also in Echo City. In 2004 Susie and Giles Perring wrote 'Marsh Music'  a piece incorporating tape loops of traffic from the A13 which formed part of a major mixed exhibition by the Architecture Foundation in collaboration with Jock McFadyen, Helena Ben Zenou, Iain Sinclair and Chris Petit. In 2005 the Wapping Project joined the Jerwood Foundation and Jazz on 3 (BBC) to commission a piece of music from Honeyman and Perring to accompany the disturbing monumental photographs of Annabel Elgar.

In 2005 Honeyman and her husband Jock McFadyen founded the Grey Gallery, a nomadic entity working with artists, musicians and writers on a project by project basis. Grey Gallery projects include an award-winning survey show of the sculptor Richard Wilson for the Edinburgh Art Festival 2008 and a solo show by the artist Bob and Roberta Smith 'This Artist is Deeply Dangerous' in 2009.

Aside from the Mekons, Honeyman is a member of Little Sparta, a three piece band based in London. 
Little Sparta has performed their own score live to Lotte Reiniger's 1926 film The Adventures of Prince Achmed at the Edinburgh Festival, and written music to accompany Allan Pollok-Morris's photographic exhibition Close: A Journey in Scotland, which toured the Chicago Botanic Garden and the United States Botanic Garden in Washington in 2011 and opened at the New York Botanical Garden in 2012.

Selected discography 
The Mekons
 see The Mekons

The Fire Engines     
 Candyskin, 7", Pop Aural, 1981

Rip Rig + Panic   
 Attitude, LP, Virgin, 1983

Vivian Stanshall   
 Sir Henry at N'didi's Kraal, LP, Charisma, 1983

The Higsons    
 Music to watch girls by, 7", 1984

Echo City    
 Gramophone, LP, Gramophone Records, 1987
 The Sound of Music, CD, Some Bizzare, 1992
 Echo City – Sonic Sport 83–89 Part 1, Gramophone Records, 1995

Pere Ubu 
 Worlds in Collision, CD, Polygram / Fontana Records, 1991

A House 
 I Am The Greatest, CD, Setanta 1992

Cud (band)   
 Asquarius, A&M Records, 1992

Compilation
 Rudy's Rocking Caravan, CD, Bloodshot, 1997

Little Sparta & Gerry Mitchell 
 Scalpel Slice, CD, Fire Records, 2006
 Feasting on my heart: Keep Mother 5, 10” Vinyl, Fire Records, 2006
 The Ragged Garden, CD, Fire Records, 2007
 Little Sparta and Sally Timms, CD, Grey Gallery Records, 2009

Little Sparta 
 The Adventures of Prince Achmed, 2010
 Close: Music for an exhibition, Grey Gallery Records, 2012

References

External links
The Mekons Official fan-run website
The Mekons collection on the Internet Archive's live music archive
Little Sparta at bandcamp.com
Echo City
Susie Honeyman Discography at Discogs.com
The Grey Gallery
Giles Perring website
The Wapping Project \ Bankside website
Annabel Elgar website
Allan Pollock-Morris website 

1960 births
Living people
Musicians from Glasgow
Scottish violinists
British rock violinists
Alumni of the University of Edinburgh
20th-century Scottish women
20th-century Scottish musicians
21st-century Scottish women
21st-century Scottish musicians
21st-century violinists